Anja Scherl (born 12 April 1986) is a German long distance runner who specialises in the marathon. She competed in the women's marathon event at the 2016 Summer Olympics where she finished in 44th place.

Scherl finished well in the marathon but her success was overshadowed by Anna and Lisa Hahner who controversially crossed the finishing line together at position 81 and 82. They were accused of trying to attract media attention and they did get more coverage than Scherl.

References

External links
 

1986 births
Living people
Place of birth missing (living people)
German female long-distance runners
German female marathon runners
Olympic female marathon runners
Olympic athletes of Germany
Athletes (track and field) at the 2016 Summer Olympics
German national athletics champions
People from Amberg
Sportspeople from the Upper Palatinate
20th-century German women
21st-century German women